Karamana Janardanan Nair (25 July 1936 – 24 April 2000) was a Malayalam film actor, who was active during the 1980s and 1990s. He was especially known for his character roles.  He won wide acclaim especially for the role of the protagonist in Adoor Gopalakrishnan's Elippathayam (1981). He notably played the villain role along with Thilakan in Pattanapravesham(1988). He played the lead role in the K. G. George directed film Mattoral, supported by Mammootty, which was released in 1988. His last role was as Fr. Paulose in the movie FIR (1999) and died a year later.

Personal life
He was born to Karamana Kunjuveettil Ramaswami Iyyer and Bhargaviyamma on 27 July 1936. He had his primary education from Govt Model Boys High School, Chalai. After doing  B.A., he pursued L.L.B. from Government Law College, Thiruvananthapuram. He also holds Masters in History from University College Thiruvananthapuram. While at college he was an active member of Student's Federation of India (SFI). He worked at Employees Provident Fund Organisation in Pattom and Akasahvani. He was an active member of Thiruvananthapuram drama clubs. He went to study at National School of Drama in 1962.

He was married to Jaya J Nair. The couple have three children Sunil, Sudheer & Sujay. His son, Sudheer Karamana, is also an actor. He died of a massive stroke complicated by prolonged diabetes on 24 April 2000, aged 64.

Filmography 

Ente Priyappetta Muthuvinu (2000)
F.I.R. (1999) as Fr. Paulose
The Truth (1998)
Pranayavarnagal (1998) as Maya's Father
Raktha Sakshikal Sindabad (1998) as Raman Thirumulpadu
Kaliyoonjal (1997) as Raghavan master
Janathipathyam (1997) as Kannan Menon 
Kalyana Unnikal (1997) as Musakutty Musaliyar 
Mahaathma (1996) as Ramakrishna Kurup
Agnidevan (1995) as Vasudeva Warrier 
Spadikam (1995) as Fr. Ottaplakkan
Vrudhanmare Sookshikkuka (1995) as Goda Varma 
Commissioner (1994) as Justice Mahendran 
Bharya (1994) as Shankaran Nair
Malappuram Haji Mahanaya Joji (1994)
Bhagyavan (1994) as Mulankattu Gurukkal
Sraadham (1994)
Moonnam Loka Pattalam (1994) as Rama Varma
Varabhalam (1994) as Geetha's father
Golanthara Vartha (1993) as Lekha's father
Ammayane Sathyam (1993) as Omanakuttan's Father 
Janam (1993) as Ananthan 
Oru Kochu Bhoomikilukkam (1992) as Bhargavan Pillai 
Adharam as Abdullah 
Cheppadi Vidya (1992) as Thankappan 
Nayam Vaykkthamaakkunnu (1991)
Kalamorukkam (1991) as Shekharan Thampi
Bhoomika (1991) as Memana Madhava Panikkar 
Aanaval Mothiram (1991) as Home Minister Ramachandra Kurup
Kizhakkunarum Pakshi (1991) as Krishnan Namboothiri
Parallel College (1991)
His Highness Abdulla (1990) as Prabhakara Varma 
Malayogam (1990) as Mathachan 
Sasneham (1990) as Thamarassery Kuriachan
Kalikkalam (1990) as Public Prosecutor Aravindan
Mathilukal (1990) as Raghavan
Mudra (1989) as Pathrose 
Utharam (1989) as Fr. Kunnathoor
Mazhavilkavadi (1989) as Nanukuttan 
Dasharatham (1989) as Pillai 
Padippura (1989)
Artham (1989) as George Zachariah 
Adhipan (1989) as Peethambaran
Vellanakalude Nadu (1988) as  Radhakrishnan Nair 
Mattoral (1988) as Kaimal
Ponmuttayidunna Thaaraavu (1988) as Hajjiyar
Ambalakkara Panjayathu (1988)
Dhwani (1988) as Kuttisankaran 
Dinarathrangal (1988) as Sankarath Madhava Menon 
Pattanapravesham (1988) as Prabhakaran Thampi
Swargam (1987)
Itha Samayamayi (1987) as Parameshwaran Pillai
January Oru Orma (1987) as Ponnayyan 
Amrutham Gamaya (1987) as Medical College Professor 
Icecream (1986)
Meenamasathile Sooryan (1986) as Janmi 
Ozhivukaalam (1985) as Ramachandran
Thinkalaazhcha Nalla Divasam (1985) as Narayanankutty 
Avidathe Pole Ivideyum (1985)
Puli Varunne Puli (1985) as Commissioner 
Oru Naal Innoru Naal (1985)
Mukhamukham (1984)
Arorumariyathe (1984) as Rama Varma 
Ariyatha Veethikal (1984) as Bhaskaran 
Aduthaduthu (1984) as Ayyappan
Elippathayam (1981) as Unni 
Swayamvaram (1972) as Thommachan
Urangaatha Sundari (1969) as Adv John (uncredited role)

Television
Kairali Vilasam Lodge (Doordarshan)
Pakshi Sasthram (Telefilm, Doordarshan)

References

External links
 
 Karamana Janardhanan Nair at MSI

Male actors from Thiruvananthapuram
2000 deaths
1936 births
Male actors in Malayalam cinema
Indian male film actors
20th-century Indian male actors
21st-century Indian male actors
Government Law College, Thiruvananthapuram alumni